Sargent Township may refer to:

 Sargent Township, Douglas County, Illinois
 Sargent Township, Texas County, Missouri
 Sargent Township, Custer County, Nebraska
 Sargent Township, North Dakota

See also
 Sargeant Township, Mower County, Minnesota

Township name disambiguation pages